Howrah (alternatively spelled as Haora) is a city in the Indian state of West Bengal. Howrah is located on the western bank of the Hooghly River opposite its twin city of Kolkata. Administratively it lies within Howrah district, and is the headquarters of the Howrah Sadar subdivision. It is a part of the area covered by the Kolkata Metropolitan Development Authority. Howrah is an important transportation hub and gateway to Kolkata and West Bengal.

Etymology
The name came from the word Haor—Bengali word for a fluvial swampy lake, which is sedimentologically a depression where water, mud and organic debris accumulate. The word itself was rather used in eastern part of Bengal (now Bangladesh), as compared to the western part (now West Bengal).

History
The history of the city of Howrah dates back over 500 years, but the district is situated in an area historically occupied by the ancient Bengali kingdom of Bhurshut. Venetian explorer Cesare Federici, who travelled in India during 1565–79, mentioned a place called Buttor in his journal circa 1578. As per his description, this was a location into which large ships could travel (presumably the Hoogli river) and perhaps a commercial port. This place is identifiable with the modern day neighbourhood of Bator. Bator was also mentioned in the Bengali poetry Manasamangal written by Bipradas Pipilai in 1495.

In 1713, the Bengal Council of the British East India Company, on the accession of the Emperor Farrukhsiyar, grandson of Aurangzeb, to the throne of Delhi, sent a deputation to him with a petition for a settlement of five villages on west bank of Hooghly river along with thirty-three villages on the east bank. The list of villages appeared in the Consultation Book of the Council dated 4 May 1714. The five villages on the west bank on Hooghly river were: 'Salica' (Salkia), 'Harirah' (Howrah), 'Cassundeah' (Kasundia), 'Ramkrishnopoor' (Ramkrishnapur) and 'Battar' (Bator): all identifiable with localities of modern-day Howrah city. The deputation was successful except for these five villages. By 1728, most of the present-day Howrah district was part of either of the two zamindaris: Burdwan or Muhammand Aminpur.

On 11 October 1760, as a result of the Battle of Plassey, the East India Company signed a treaty with Mir Qasim, the Nawab of Bengal, to take over the control of Howrah district. In 1787 the Hooghly district was formed and in 1819 the whole of the present day Howrah district was added to it. The Howrah district was separated from the Hooghly district in 1843.

Demographics
Dependent on definitions and geographical boundaries Howrah is measured as either the 2nd or 3rd largest city in West Bengal (behind Kolkata, and perhaps Asansol). In 2011 Bally had a population of 293,373.

This rapid growth was due to abundance of job opportunities, which resulted in a 100% increase in male population during this period, whereas the female population grew only by 60%.

Geography

Climate
Howrah has a Tropical wet-and-dry climate (Köppen climate classification Aw). The summers here have a good deal of rainfall, while the winters have very little. The temperature averages 26.3 °C. Precipitation averages 1744 mm.

Civic administration
Howrah Municipal Corporation is responsible for the administration of Howrah. The tenure of the last board of HMC had ended back on 10 December 2018. From then onwards the corporation has been run by unelected board of administrators selected by the West Bengal government. The Howrah City Police is responsible for law enforcement in the city.

History
Howrah Municipality was established in 1862. From 1896, it started supplying filter water across the city. During 1882–83, Bally Municipality was formed separating it out from Howrah. As per the Howrah Municipal Corporation Act of 1980, Howrah became a municipal corporation in 1984. The corporation area was divided into fifty wards, each of which elects a councillor. The Mayor-in-council, which is led by Mayor and supported by Commissioner and officers, is responsible for administration of the corporation area. In 2015, the Bally Municipality was re-amalgamated into Howrah Municipal Corporation, through Corporation vide notification no. 428/MA/O/C-4/IM-36/2014 dated 26 June 2015, which increased the total number of wards to 66.

Other administrative offices
Howrah also hosts the temporary administrative office of the state of West Bengal. The office of the Chief Minister of state had been traditionally posted at the Writers' Building, however owing to renovation of the building, the administration has been occupying the Nabanna building.

Development and growth
Even though it is one of the largest cities in the state, Howrah witnessed urbanization in an unplanned manner. As a result, Howrah is continuing to face its perennial problems like traffic congestion, population explosion and pollution.

The city contains a few unlicensed and unregulated residential areas or slums. The name of the novel City of Joy, which has been often the name the Kolkata metropolis been called, is actually based on one such slum of Howrah.

However, recently, work has been done on broadening the National Highways and several local roads. These activities are expected to help in improvement of traffic conditions. Of late, Howrah has seen a lot of new industrial proposals like the Kona Truck Terminus, Kolkata West International City and relocation of the old smoky foundry plants.. The West Bengal Government has also planned a major renovation of the city to match the city's urban facilities with its neighboring city Kolkata.

Kolkata Metropolitan Development Authority (KMDA) is the statutory planning and development authority for Howrah, as the city lies within the Kolkata Metropolitan Area (KMA).

Economy
Often termed as Sheffield of the East, Howrah is known as an engineering hub, mainly in the area of light engineering industry. In 1823, Bishop Reginald Heber described Howrah as the place "chiefly inhabited by shipbuilders". There are small engineering firms all over Howrah, particularly around Belilios Road area near Howrah station However these businesses are declining in the 21st century. There are many foundries in Liluah area.

Burn Standard Company, a major company in heavy engineering industry, has its oldest manufacturing unit located in Howrah. The Howrah plant of Shalimar Paints (established in 1902) was the first large-scale paint manufacturing plant to be set up not only in India but in entire South East Asia. The jute industry suffered during the Partition of Bengal (1947), when the larger jute production area became part of East Pakistan (now Bangladesh). The foundry industry saw a decline in demand due to growth in steel industry.

Transport
Howrah can be accessed from its many rail links, road links to National Highways, as well as its transport connections to Kolkata. Apart from the bridges connecting the cities, there are also ferry services between various jetties.

Rail

Howrah Junction railway station (more commonly referred to as Howrah Station) is the major railway station serving Howrah, Kolkata and the neighbouring districts. It is the second busiest rail station in India, along with being the largest largest railway station in terms of number of platform. It was established in 1854 when a railway line was constructed connecting the city to the coalfields of Bardhaman. Howrah Station serves as a terminal for two railway zones of India: the Eastern Railway and the South Eastern Railway, and it is connected to most of the major cities of India. From Howrah both Eastern Railway and South Eastern Railway operates connecting various stations of the districts of Howrah, Hooghly, Bardhaman, East Midnapore and West Midnapore. Within Howrah city itself, there are twelve more stations, the most prominents being Santragachi and Shalimar.

Metro rail

Howrah is planned to be served by the Kolkata Metro Line 2 with Salt Lake in Kolkata via a tunnel under River Hooghly. On the Howrah side, the 2 Stations will be at Howrah Station and Howrah Maidan. As of February 2022 these stations are under construction.

Roads
Howrah hosts a branch of the Grand Trunk Road – this was built, starting 1804, by the Public Works Department of the British administration. The road starts at the Acharya Jagadish Chandra Bose Indian Botanic Garden and connects to the main road near Chandannagar. Howrah also connects the metropolitan region to the national highways – NH 16 and NH 19, which are connected to Vidyasagar Setu via the Kona Expressway.

Bridges

Howrah and Kolkata are separated by the Hooghly River/Ganges and connected by four bridges across the river. These are the:

Howrah Bridge, also known as Rabindra Setu
Vidyasagar Setu, also known as the second Hooghly Bridge
Vivekananda Setu, also known as Bally Bridge
Nivedita Setu, also known as Second Bally Bridge

The cantilever style Howrah Bridge and the cable-stayed Vidyasagar Setu are counted among the longest bridges in the world within their types.

Other transport
There are ferry services available, between various jetties in Howrah and Kolkata, which was introduced in the 1970s. The jetties on Howrah side are at Howrah Station, Ramkrishnapur, Shibpur, Shalimar, Bandhaghat, Belur Math, Bally and Nazirganj. Howrah is also served by Netaji Subhas Chandra Bose International Airport, located in Dumdum, Kolkata.

Neighbourhoods

Howrah has many various neighbourhoods, the most notable being Shibpur, Santragachi, Belur, Ramrajatala, Liluah and Bally. Shibpur hosts the Acharya Jagadish Chandra Bose Indian Botanic Garden, containing the Great Banyan tree, and the Indian Institute of Engineering Science and Technology, Shibpur. Santragachi has a large railway station as well as the Santragachhi Jheel, a large lake that attracts migratory birds during winter. Belur hosts Belur Math, the headquarters of the Ramakrishna Math and Mission. Ramrajatala hosts a famous Rama Temple. Near Howrah Station is the slum of Pilkhana which was the basis of the famous book and film "City of Joy". Liluah host some of India's oldest railway factories and is also the educational Hub of Howrah.

Education

The Indian Institute of Engineering Science and Technology, Shibpur is a public engineering and research institution. It is the second oldest engineering institution in India, and is an institute of national importance.

Howrah's schools are either run by the state government or by private institutions. The medium of instruction is Bengali, English or Hindi. Schools are affiliated to the West Bengal Board of Secondary Education (WBBSE), West Bengal Council of Higher Secondary Education (WBCHSE), the Indian Certificate of Secondary Education (ICSE), National Institute of Open Schooling (NIOS) and Central Board of Secondary Education (CBSE).

Howrah Zilla School, established in 1845, is the only Governmental school in Howrah.
Howrah's first vernacular Bengali medium school, established in 1857, was Santragachi Minor School. Currently the school is running as Santragachi Kedarnath Institution, Howrah.

Sports
The Sailen Manna Stadium, also known as the Howrah Municipal Corporation Stadium, is a multi-use stadium that hosts sporting events for association football. Dumurjala Sports City is a multi-purpose sports complex at Dumurjala.

Notable people

Gallery

Footnotes

References

Bibliography

External links

History of Howrah from India Government Site
Howrah Municipal Corporation Site
Satellite View of Howrah
Howrah Train Time Table

 
Cities and towns in Howrah district
Kolkata Metropolitan Area
Howrah district
Cities in West Bengal